Il Brigante Musolino (Italian: The Brigand Musolino), released in the US as Outlaw Girl, is a 1950 Italian crime drama film inspired by the life of the Calabrian outlaw Giuseppe Musolino. It was directed and written by Mario Camerini. The film stars Amedeo Nazzari and Silvana Mangano.

Cast
Amedeo Nazzari as Giuseppe ("Peppino" or "Beppe") Musolino
Silvana Mangano as Mara
Ignazio Balsamo as  Schepisi
Guido Celano as Police Sergeant
Rocco D'Assunta as  The Sacristan
Arnoldo Foà
Giacomo Giuradi as  Marco Sgroli
Elvira Betrone
Nino Pavese as  Innkeeper
Umberto Spadaro as The Doctor

External links

1950 films
Italian historical drama films
1950s Italian-language films
Italian black-and-white films
1950 crime drama films
1950s historical drama films
Films set in Calabria
Lux Film films
Films scored by Enzo Masetti
Italian crime drama films
1950s Italian films